Rectrix Aviation was a jet charter and commuter airline service that primarily served New England, Florida and the east coast of the United States. Its commercial operations were primarily based at Nantucket Memorial Airport and Barnstable Municipal Airport in Nantucket and Hyannis, Massachusetts, respectively.  Rectrix Shuttle, the commuter service, was founded when Island Airlines of Nantucket shut down. In December 2019 new parent company Ross Aviation ceased all commercial flights and began the shutdown of the charter department consolidating Rectrix to only an FBO operation.

Rectrix's charter flights were based at Sarasota, Florida, Bedford, Massachusetts, Hyannis, and Westfield, Massachusetts. Rectrix acquired its worldwide jet operating authority in 2009 with its acquisition of New World Jet Corporation.

Fixed-Base Operation Services

Rectrix currently has FBOs at the following locations. Parent company Ross Aviation announced after acquiring that despite complete integration to their network the brand would remain unchanged at current locations for the foreseeable future.

 Laurence G. Hanscom Field - Bedford, MA
 Barnstable Municipal Airport - Hyannis, MA
 Sarasota-Bradenton International Airport - Sarasota, FL
 Westfield-Barnes Regional Airport - Westfield, MA
 Worcester Regional Airport - Worcester, MA

History

On November 4, 2015, Rectrix Aviation purchased Five Star Jet Center at Westfield-Barnes Regional Airport and announced plans to expand its services and staff at the airport, making it the only fixed base operator or FBO at the Westfield-Barnes.

On February 8, 2016; Submitted an application to the Department of Transportation to conduct scheduled air service as a commuter carrier. The application proposed scheduled service between Hyannis, MA (KHYA) and Nantucket, MA (KACK).

On June 26, 2017, Rectrix announced commercial service dubbed the Rectrix Shuttle which connected Worcester Regional Airport and Barnstable Municipal Airport that featured one round-trip flight daily from Thursday to Monday. "It's the first major expansion of Rectrix's current Hyannis to Nantucket shuttle service," the company said.

On October 25, 2017, Rectrix introduced new non-stop scheduled weekend service between Cape Cod and New York City's LaGuardia Airport and Westchester County Airport. Service to Worcester was suspended in the Summer of 2019 due to low demand.

In February 2019, Rectrix was acquired by Ross Aviation. On December 2, 2019, Ross Aviation announced the end of commercial operations and began liquidating their charter department.

Destinations
Rectrix Shuttle flew scheduled charter flights to the following destinations:

Fleet

Charter fleet 
The following chart shows all the aircraft owned by Rectrix Aviation that were available for charter.

Commuter fleet

Rectrix Shuttle
The following chart shows all the aircraft Rectrix Aviation used for commuter flights.

See also 
 List of defunct airlines of the United States

References

External links 
 Rectrix Aviation

Defunct regional airlines of the United States
Airlines established in 2006
Airlines disestablished in 2017
American companies established in 2006
Defunct charter airlines of the United States
American companies disestablished in 2017
Defunct airlines of the United States